Ana María López Calleja (born 30 November 1968) is a retired Spanish Paralympic athlete who competed in 100 metres and long jump events at the 1992 Summer Paralympics winning a bronze medal in the long jump. She later went on to participate in cycling at the 2008 Summer Paralympics but did not medal in her events.

References

1968 births
Living people
Athletes from Madrid
Paralympic athletes of Spain
Paralympic cyclists of Spain
Spanish female sprinters
Spanish female long jumpers
Spanish female cyclists
Athletes (track and field) at the 1992 Summer Paralympics
Medalists at the 1992 Summer Paralympics
Cyclists at the 2008 Summer Paralympics
Paralympic medalists in athletics (track and field)
Paralympic bronze medalists for Spain